Ramenye is a rural locality (a village) in Markushevskoye Rural Settlement, Tarnogsky District, Vologda Oblast, Russia. The population was 55 as of 2002.

Geography 
Ramenye is located 59 km southeast of Tarnogsky Gorodok (the district's administrative centre) by road. Klenovaya is the nearest locality. etymology

References 

Rural localities in Tarnogsky District